Nielsen is a lunar impact crater on the Oceanus Procellarum. It is located north-east of Montes Agricola on the western hemisphere of the Moon. To the east-southeast is the crater Wollaston.

Nielsen is a bowl-shaped formation that lies astride a small ridge that runs north-northwestwards towards the Mons Rümker. The latter is an unusual raised formation of lunar domes.

The crater is named jointly after the Danish astronomer Axel Nielsen (1902-1970) and the Danish–American physicist Harald Herborg Nielsen (1903-1973).

References

External links

 http://www.lunarrepublic.com/atlas/sections/c2.shtml

Impact craters on the Moon